The Medal of National Defense Service  is a military decoration awarded by the Central Military Commission of China, first amended on May 4, 2010, then established on August 1, 2011. It was divided into three grades, but in 2022 it's re-divided into 5 grades.

Criteria

2011 criteria 
The medal is awarded to military officers, civilian cadres and soldiers who have served for the People's Liberation Army for more than 10 years. Among them: 
 A person who served more than 10 years and less than 20 years is awarded with a bronze medal, 
 A person who served more than 20 years and less than 35 years is awarded with  a silver medal,
 A person who served more than 35 years is awarded with a gold medal.

Service Ribbon

2022 criteria 
In February 2022, the original 3-rank criteria were re-ranked with a new 5-rank criteria:

 A person who served for at least 50 years is awarded with a special level medal
 A person who served for at least 40 years and less than 50 years is awarded with a level 1 medal
 A person who served for at least 30 years and less than 40 years is awarded with a level 2 medal
 A person who served for at least 16 years and less than 30 years is awarded with a level 3 medal
 A person who served for at least 8 years and less than 16 years is awarded with a level 4 medal

References 

Awards established in 2011
Military awards and decorations of the People's Liberation Army